Harry Nielsen may refer to:

 Harry Nielsen (cricketer) (born 1995), Australian cricketer
 Harry Nielsen (politician) (1895–1981), American politician from Iowa
 Harry Nielsen (rower) (born 1930), Danish rower